Datuk Liwan Lagang is a Malaysian politician from the Parti Rakyat Sarawak (PRS), a component party of the ruling Gabungan Parti Sarawak (GPS) coalition who has served as the State Deputy Minister of Telecommunication of Sarawak in charge of Telecommunication in the GPS state administration under Premier Abang Abdul Rahman Johari Abang Openg and State Minister Julaihi Narawi since January 2022 and Member of the Sarawak State Legislative Assembly (MLA) for Belaga since May 2006.

Education 
Liwan completed his Senior Cambridge education in Kanowit in 1975.

Political career 
After becoming a two-term state assemblyman by successfully defending his seat during the 2011 Sarawak state election, Liwan was appointed assistant minister for social development in charge of culture and heritage portfolio.

Between 2016 and 2017, Liwan was appointed as an assistant minister in charge of river transportation and safety.

In 2017, Chief Minister of Sarawak Abang Abdul Rahman Johari Abang Openg reshuffled his cabinet and reappointed Liwan to the water supplies portfolio.

On 22 August 2019, Chief Minister Abang Johari once again reshuffled his cabinet, with Lagang transferred to the Ministry of Utilities handling the rural electricity portfolio. He is one of the two assistant ministers to Dr. Stephen Rundi Utom at the ministry, alongside his successor to the water supplies portfolio, Dr. Abdul Rahman Junaidi.

On 30 December 2021, Chief Minister Abang Johari unveiled his new Cabinet lineup. Lagang was then appointed as Assistant Minister of Utilities and Telecommunication in charge of Telecommunication on 4 January 2022.

Election results

Honours 
  :
  Medallist of the Order of the Defender of the Realm (PPN) (1997)
  Officer of the Order of the Defender of the Realm (KMN) (2009)
  Commander of the Order of Meritorious Service (PJN) – Datuk (2017)

See also 
 Belaga (state constituency)

References 

Living people
21st-century Malaysian politicians
Parti Rakyat Sarawak politicians
Members of the Sarawak State Legislative Assembly
Medallists of the Order of the Defender of the Realm
Officers of the Order of the Defender of the Realm
Commanders of the Order of Meritorious Service
People from Sarawak
1957 births